Gong Balai is a very small fishing village in Terengganu, Malaysia. Location Coordinates: 5°1'11"N 103°18'12"E. It is in an area of outstanding beaches that is occasionally visited by turtles.

Villages in Terengganu